The Université de Ouargla (officially Université Kasdi Merbah Ouargla) is a university located in Ouargla, Algeria. It was founded on March 22, 1988.

Enrollment
For the academic year 2012–2013, there were 18,767 undergraduate students, 3,590 Masters students and 709 PhD students enrolled in the university.

See also 
 List of universities in Algeria

References

External links
 University of Ouargla official website

1988 establishments in Algeria
Educational institutions established in 1988
Ouargla
Buildings and structures in Ouargla Province